Jiang Yiyuan (November 17, 1928 - February 24, 2020) was a Chinese agricultural engineer and academician of the Chinese Academy of Engineering (CAE). He was a member of the Chinese Society for Agricultural Machinery and Chinese Society of Agricultural Engineering.

Biography
Jiang was born in Changzhou, Jiangsu, on November 17, 1928. His father was a merchant. He attended Zhengheng High School. In 1946 he enrolled at the University of Nanking, where he graduated in 1950. After university, he was hired as a teacher at Northeast Agricultural University, where he successively served as lecturer, associate professor, and professor. He joined the Communist Party of China in 1956. In 1982, he became a senior visiting scholar at Michigan State University. He died of illness in Harbin, Heilongjiang, on  February 24, 2020, aged 91.

Honours and awards
 1997 Member of the Chinese Academy of Engineering (CAE)

References

1928 births
2020 deaths
People from Changzhou
Engineers from Jiangsu
Northeast Agricultural University alumni
Members of the Chinese Academy of Engineering
People of the Republic of China